Masters is a 2012  Malayalam action crime thriller film directed by Johny Antony and starring Prithviraj Sukumaran and M. Sasikumar with Mukesh, Biju Menon, Pia Bajpai, Mithra Kurian, Saikumar and Vijayaraghavan in supporting roles. This film is loosely based on the English film Strangers on a Train.

Plot
Milan Paul and Sreeramakrishnan aka Sree are best friends who have been together since college time. The intensity of their friendship has not faded though the carefree days of college have long past gone. Now Sree is an ASP (Assistant Superintendent of Police) of Kottayam and Milan is a renowned reporter in the same city. Though in different fields, both are in highly responsible jobs. In effect, both of them use their friendship to fulfill their respective social responsibilities. Hot-tempered and impulsive, Sree usually ends up in some sort of trouble and is always saved by Milan in the nick of the time. Consequently, Milan has to deal with Sree's enemies, but Sree reciprocates by saving Milan. 

Things were going on just fine when out of the blue, a horrendous incident shocks the city. A series of suicide-murders happen, and what bewilders the Police is the lack of any apparent reason for the murderers to kill the victims. In many cases, the murderers have not met the victims ever before the incident. It is then revealed that all the person who has done suicide murders has exchanged their enemies. And all were those who got injustice in the society. And hence, he learns that Milan was the with the suicide-murderers. Sree learns from Sethunathan, a suicide-murderer whom  he captures that the last target is Advocate Narayanan Thambi, a corrupt lawyer. Milan reveals Narayanan insulted Milan's mother Mary Paulose and she died because of him. Sree saves Narayanan from Milan, by defeating him. And consoles Milan that he needs him, but Narayanan kills Milan with Sree's gun and shoots Sree on his chest. Enraged, Sree kills Narayanan.

Cast

Production
The film started its shooting in August 2011 at Kottayam, Kerala. The soundtrack is scored by Gopi Sundar along with lyrics by Shibu Chakravarthi. Masters is produced under the banner of Sincere Cinemas by B. Sarath Chandran and distributed by Seven Arts International.

Reception
The Movie received a positive response from critics and become a hit in the box office.
 Nowrunning  stated, "The film has all the makings of a commercial potboiler that should see it sailing smoothly through the box office seas for a while. Way too superior to the generic thrillers being churned out by the dozen, 'Masters' is a cool chiller for this summer, that delivers its jolt moments with aplomb."
 Metromatinee rated the film as "watchable" and praised that "the lead actors look refreshingly different and capable of carrying the movie on their shoulders. The story and the dialogues are lively and thrilled at some level, background music is peppy, action scenes are appropriate and the whole package will appeal to the viewers of all ages. On the whole 'Masters' has blended well to make a neat racy entertainer".
 Another critic remarked that it is "a good one time watch, if you can just pass out the first half for some good performance, great climax and clever story in the second half. And I should love to tell, this may end up as one of the good police story in the recent times."

Soundtrack

References

External links
 

2012 films
2010s Malayalam-language films
Films scored by Gopi Sundar
2012 action thriller films
Indian action thriller films
Fictional portrayals of the Kerala Police
Films directed by Johny Antony